At the 1913 Far Eastern Championship Games, the athletics events were held in Manila, Philippines in February. A total of seventeen events were contested in the men-only competition.

Medal summary

Medal table

References

Far Eastern Championships. GBR Athletics. Retrieved on 2014-12-18.

1913
Far Eastern Championship Games
1913 Far Eastern Championship Games
1913 in Philippine sport